Cornaclea (Irish derived place name, Corr na Cléithe meaning 'The Round-Hill of the Palisade'.) is a townland in the civil parish of Kildallan, barony of Tullyhunco, County Cavan, Ireland. It is also called Tawlagh (Irish derived place name, Tamhlacht meaning ‘The Plague-Grave’).

Geography

Cornaclea is bounded on the north by Drummully East townland, on the west by Coolnashinny and Shancroaghan townlands and on the east by Derrygid townland. Its chief geographical features are Dumb Lough, Town Lake, the Castle River and small streams. Cornaclea is traversed by minor public roads and rural lanes. The townland covers 63 acres.

History

From medieval times up to the early 1600s, the land belonged to the McKiernan Clan.

The 1609 Plantation of Ulster Map depicts the townland as Taulaght. A government grant of 1610 spells the name as Towlaght. A 1629 Inquisition spells the name as Tawlaght and Carclea. The 1652 Commonwealth Survey spells the name as Tawlaght.

In the Plantation of Ulster King James VI and I by grant dated 23 July 1610 granted the Manor of Clonyn or Taghleagh, which included  one poll of Towlaght, to Sir Alexander Hamilton of Innerwick, Scotland. On 29 July 1611 Arthur Chichester, 1st Baron Chichester and others reported that- . An Inquisition held at Cavan on 10 June 1629 stated that the  poll of Tawlaght contained four sub-divisions named Coulnahinsin, Carclea, Curragh and Coulnemuckelagh. It also described the boundary of the townland as- .

The 1652 Commonwealth Survey lists the owner as Sir Francis Hamilton.

The 1790 Cavan Carvaghs list spells the townland name as Tawlagh.

The 1825 Tithe Applotment Books list one tithepayer in the townland.

The Cornaclea Valuation Office books are available for April 1838.

There is an estate map and detailed description of Cornaclea in 1849.

Griffith's Valuation of 1857 lists one landholder in the townland.

The landlord of Cornaclea in the 19th century was James Hamilton.

Census

In the 1901 census of Ireland, there is one family listed in the townland.

In the 1911 census of Ireland, there is one family listed in the townland.

References

External links
 The IreAtlas Townland Data Base

Townlands of County Cavan